Ezekiel is the Graecised version of the Hebrew name Yehezkel, denoting a prophet of the Hebrew Bible. The form Ezekiel is used in the Christian Old Testament.

Ezekiel may also refer to:

People
 Ezekiel (name), a variant of the Hebrew name Yehezkel, used as both a given name and surname (including a list of people and fictional characters with the name)
 Ezekiel, a ring name of American professional wrestler Elias
 Yehezkel, an alternate spelling of the Hebrew prophet Ezekiel (including a list of people with the name)

Arts, entertainment, and media

Fictional characters
 King Ezekiel, in The Walking Dead franchise
 Ezekiel, from the Total Drama animated series

Literature
 Book of Ezekiel, a book of the Hebrew and Christian Bibles

Music
 Book of Ezekiel (album), 2007 album of rapper Freekey Zekey
 EZ3kiel, French alternative music band

See also